Chiang Shih-lu (born 16 December 1982) is a Taiwanese football player who currently plays for Taipower as a striker. He has often been called Fast Legs of Taipower (台電快腿) for his fast speed on the field.

Career statistics

International goals

Honours
 With Taiwan Power Company F.C.
Enterprise Football League: 2007

 Individual
Enterprise Football League MVP: 2007
Enterprise Football League Golden Boot: 2006, 2007

External links
 Chiang Shih-lu at LTSports 

1982 births
Living people
Taiwan Power Company F.C. players
Taiwanese footballers
Association football forwards
Footballers from Taipei